Rebecca Kulimoetoke is an artist and teacher from Wallis, in the French overseas territory of Wallis and Futuna. An expert in tapa cloth, she is also a visual artist, with her painting featured in exhibitions and on stamps. She donated several of her works to the Musée du Vivant-AgroParisTech, where they are displayed with objects loaned by Uvea Museum Association. In 2015 her work was displayed as part of Dordogne's Histoire de passages festival. She studied at Jean Monnet University before returning to Wallis.

Philately 
Kulimoetoke's paintings have been used on several stamps issued by Wallis and Futuna, including: 'Seaside' (200 Fr - 2006), commemorating World Youth Day (350 Fr - 2018), to mark the centenary of the birth of Lavelua Tomasi Kulimoetoke (600 Fr - 2018), for Bastille Day (500 Fr - 2018).

References

External links 

 A painting by Kulimoetoke of Santa Claus
 Work by Kulimoetoke inspired by tapa

Living people
Year of birth missing (living people)
Wallis and Futuna artists
Wallis and Futuna educators
Wallis and Futuna people
Stamp designers
20th-century French women artists
Women educators